In commutative algebra and algebraic geometry, localization is a formal way to introduce the "denominators" to a given ring or module. That is, it introduces a new ring/module out of an existing ring/module R, so that it consists of fractions  such that the denominator s belongs to a given subset S of R. If S is the set of the non-zero elements of an integral domain, then the localization is the field of fractions: this case generalizes the construction of the field  of rational numbers from the ring  of integers.

The technique has become fundamental, particularly in algebraic geometry, as it provides a natural link to sheaf theory. In fact, the term localization originated in algebraic geometry: if R is a ring of functions defined on some geometric object (algebraic variety) V, and one wants to study this variety "locally" near a point p, then one considers the set S of all functions that are not zero at p and localizes R with respect to S. The resulting ring  contains information about the behavior of V near p, and excludes information that is not "local", such as the zeros of functions that are outside V (c.f. the example given at local ring).

Localization of a ring 

If the ring is an integral domain the construction generalizes and follows closely that of the field of fractions, and, in particular, that of the rational numbers as the field of fractions of the integers. For rings that have zero divisors, the construction is similar but requires more care.

Multiplicative set
Localization is commonly done with respect to a multiplicatively closed set  (also called a multiplicative set or a multiplicative system) of elements of a ring , that is a subset of  that is closed under multiplication, and contains .

As this often makes reasoning and notation simpler, it is standard practice to consider only localizations by multiplicative sets.

Therefore, one generally talks of "the localization by the powers of an element" rather than of "the localization by an element".

The localization of a ring  by a multiplicative set  is generally denoted  but other notations are commonly used in some special cases: if  consists of the powers of a single element,  is often denoted  if  is the complement of a prime ideal , then  is denoted 

In the remainder of this article, only localizations by a multiplicative set are considered.

Integral domains 
As such, the localization of a domain is a domain.

For example, the decimal fractions are the localization of the ring of integers by the multiplicative set of the powers of ten.

General construction 
In the general case, a problem arises with zero divisors. Let  be a multiplicative set in a commutative ring .

The localization  is defined as the set of the equivalence classes for this relation.

The localization  is a commutative ring with addition 

multiplication

additive identity  and multiplicative identity 

The function 

defines a ring homomorphism from  into  which is injective if and only if  does not contain any zero divisors.

If  then  is the zero ring that has  as unique element.

Universal property 
The (above defined) ring homomorphism  satisfies a universal property that is described below. This characterizes  up to an isomorphism. So all properties of localizations can be deduced from the universal property, independently from the way they have been constructed. Moreover, many important properties of localization are easily deduced from the general properties of universal properties, while their direct proof may be together technical, straightforward and boring.

Using category theory, this can be expressed by saying that localization is a functor that is left adjoint to a forgetful functor. More precisely, let  and  be the categories whose objects are pairs of a commutative ring and a submonoid of, respectively, the multiplicative monoid or the group of units of the ring. The morphisms of these categories are the ring homomorphisms that map the submonoid of the first object into the submonoid of the second one. Finally, let  be the forgetful functor that forgets that the elements of the second element of the pair are invertible.

Then the factorization  of the universal property defines a bijection

This may seem a rather tricky way of expressing the universal property, but it is useful for showing easily many properties, by using the fact that the composition of two left adjoint functors is a left adjoint functor.

Examples 
If  is the ring of integers, and  then  is the field  of the rational numbers.
The preceding example is a special case of this one.
In this case,  is the largest multiplicative set such that the homomorphism  is injective. The preceding example is a special case of this one.
If  is an element of a commutative ring  and  then  can be identified (is canonically isomorphic to)  (The proof consists of showing that this ring satisfies the above universal property.) This sort of localization plays a fundamental role in the definition of an affine scheme.
Such a property is often called a local property. For example, a ring is regular if and only if all its local rings are regular.

Ring properties 
Localization is a rich construction that has many useful properties. In this section, only the properties relative to rings and to a single localization are considered. Properties concerning ideals, modules, or several multiplicative sets are considered in other sections.

  if and only if  contains .
 The ring homomorphism  is injective if and only if  does not contain any zero divisors.
 The ring homomorphism  is an epimorphism in the category of rings, that is not surjective in general.
 The ring  is a flat -module (see  for details).
 If  is the complement of a prime ideal , then  denoted  is a local ring; that is, it has only one maximal ideal.

Properties to be moved in another section
Localization commutes with formations of finite sums, products, intersections and radicals; e.g., if  denote the radical of an ideal I in R, then

In particular, R is reduced if and only if its total ring of fractions is reduced.
Let R be an integral domain with the field of fractions K. Then its localization  at a prime ideal  can be viewed as a subring of K. Moreover,

where the first intersection is over all prime ideals and the second over the maximal ideals.
 There is a bijection between the set of prime ideals of S−1R and the set of prime ideals of R that do not intersect S. This bijection is induced by the given homomorphism R → S −1R.

Saturation of a multiplicative set 
Let  be a multiplicative set.

Saturated multiplicative sets are not widely used explicitly, since, for verifying that a set is saturated, one must know all units of the ring.

Terminology explained by the context 
The term localization originates in the general trend of modern mathematics to study geometrical and topological objects locally, that is in terms of their behavior near each point. Examples of this trend are the fundamental concepts of manifolds, germs and sheafs. In algebraic geometry, an affine algebraic set can be identified with a quotient ring of a polynomial ring in such a way that the points of the algebraic set correspond to the maximal ideals of the ring (this is Hilbert's Nullstellensatz). This correspondence has been generalized for making the set of the prime ideals of a commutative ring a topological space equipped with the Zariski topology; this topological space is called the spectrum of the ring.

In this context, a localization by a multiplicative set may be viewed as the restriction of the spectrum of a ring to the subspace of the prime ideals (viewed as points) that do not intersect the multiplicative set.

Two classes of localizations are more commonly considered:
 The multiplicative set is the complement of a prime ideal  of a ring . In this case, one  speaks of the "localization at ", or "localization at a point". The resulting ring, denoted  is a local ring, and is the algebraic analog of a ring of germs.
 The multiplicative set consists of all powers of an element  of a ring . The resulting ring is commonly denoted  and its spectrum is the Zariski open set of the prime ideals that do not contain . Thus the localization is the analog of the restriction of a topological space to a neighborhood of a point (every prime ideal has a neighborhood basis consisting of Zariski open sets of this form).

Localization and saturation of ideals 
Let  be a multiplicative set in a commutative ring , and  be the canonical ring homomorphism.

Many properties of ideals are either preserved by saturation and localization, or can be characterized by simpler properties of localization and saturation.
 
 (this is not always true for strict inclusions)
 
 
 

Localization of a module 

Addition and scalar multiplication are defined as for usual fractions (in the following formula,   and ):

Moreover,  is also an -module with scalar multiplication

It is straightforward to check that these operations are well-defined, that is, they give the same result for different choices of representatives of fractions.

The localization of a module can be equivalently defined by using tensor products:

The proof of equivalence (up to a canonical isomorphism) can be done by showing that the two definitions satisfy the same universal property.

Module properties

is also an injective homomorphism.

Since the tensor product is a right exact functor, this implies that localization by  maps exact sequences of -modules to exact sequences of -modules.

This flatness and the fact that localization solves a universal property make that localization preserves many properties of modules and rings, and is compatible with solutions of other universal properties. For example, the natural map

is an isomorphism. If  is a finitely presented module, the natural map

is also an isomorphism.

If a module M is a finitely generated over R, one has

where  denotes annihilator, that is the ideal of the elements of the ring that map to zero all elements of the module. In particular,
 
that is, if  for some

Localization at primes
The definition of a prime ideal implies immediately that the complement  of a prime ideal  in a commutative ring  is a multiplicative set.

Such localizations are fundamental for commutative algebra and algebraic geometry for several reasons. One is that local rings are often easier to study than general commutative rings, in particular because of Nakayama lemma. However, the main reason is that many properties are true for a ring if and only if they are true for all its local rings. For example, a ring is regular if and only if all its local rings are regular local rings.

Properties of a ring that can be characterized on its local rings are called local properties, and are often the algebraic counterpart of geometric local properties of algebraic varieties, which are properties that can be studied by restriction to a small neighborhood of each point of the variety. (There is another concept of local property that refers to localization to Zariski open sets; see , below.)

Many local properties are a consequence of the fact that the module

is a faithfully flat module when the direct sum is taken over all prime ideals (or over all maximal ideals of ). See also Faithfully flat descent.

Examples of local properties 
A property  of an -module  is a local property if the following conditions are equivalent:

The following are local properties:
  is zero.
  is torsion-free (in the case where  is a commutative domain).
  is  a flat module.
  is injective (resp. surjective), where  is another -module.

On the other hand, some properties are not local properties. For example, an infinite direct product of fields is not an integral domain nor a Noetherian ring, while all its local rings are fields, and therefore Noetherian integral domains.

Localization to Zariski open sets

Non-commutative case 
Localizing non-commutative rings is more difficult. While the localization exists for every set S of prospective units, it might take a different form to the one described above. One condition which ensures that the localization is well behaved is the Ore condition.

One case for non-commutative rings where localization has a clear interest is for rings of differential operators. It has the interpretation, for example, of adjoining a formal inverse D−1 for a differentiation operator D. This is done in many contexts in methods for differential equations. There is now a large mathematical theory about it, named microlocalization, connecting with numerous other branches. The micro- tag is to do with connections with Fourier theory, in particular.

See also 
 Local analysis
 Localization of a category
 Localization of a topological space

References 

Atiyah and MacDonald. Introduction to Commutative Algebra. Addison-Wesley.
Borel, Armand. Linear Algebraic Groups (2nd ed.). New York: Springer-Verlag. .
 
 
 
Matsumura.  Commutative Algebra.  Benjamin-Cummings
 
 Serge Lang, "Algebraic Number Theory," Springer, 2000. pages 3–4.

External links
 Localization from MathWorld.

Ring theory
Module theory
Localization (mathematics)